Romain Garnier (born 1976) is a French linguist who specializes in Latin and Indo-European linguistics. He has been an Assistant Professor (Maître de Conférences) since 2005 at the University of Limoges. He was the recipient of the Prix Émile Benveniste awarded in 2010 by the Académie des Inscriptions et Belles-Lettres, and became a member of the Institut Universitaire de France in 2013.

Life and career
He has authored more than 20 articles and two books on Indo-European linguistics. His main contributions concern the etymology, phonology and morphology of Proto-Indo-European and Indo-European languages, especially Latin and Greek. His book on the Latin verbal system was favorably received, as shown by positive reviews by the American linguist Andrew Miles Byrd (University of Kentucky) in Kratylos, and by the French linguist Jean-Paul Brachet (Paris-Sorbonne University) in the Bulletin de la Société de Linguistique de Paris.

He was invited in 2015 by the French popular science journal La Recherche to represent the point of view of linguists on the Indo-European theory in a debate with the French archeologist Jean-Paul Demoule, following the publication of a book in which the latter expresses skepticism about the Indo-European hypothesis.

He also published two novels in French, in 2010 and 2017. A Czech translation of his first novel, L'Héritage de Glace, was published in 2012.

Along with linguist Xavier Delamarre, he is the founding editor of the French academic journal Wékwos dedicated to Indo-European studies (founded in 2014).

Books
Academic:
2004. Thèmes grecs, Ophrys, 224 pages (book written with Lucien Pernée) 
2008. Textes épiques sanskrits, Ophrys, 225 pages 
2010. Sur le vocalisme radical du verbe Latin, Innsbrucker Beiträge zur Sprachwissenschaft, Innsbruck, 134, 519 pages 
2017. La Dérivation inverse en latin, Innsbrucker Beiträge zur Sprachwissenschaft, Innsbruck, 157, 524 pages 
2017. Scripta Selecta, Les Cent Chemins, Paris, 547 pages 

Novels:
2010 L'Héritage de Glace, Paris, Plon. .
2012 Mrazivé dědictví, Prague, PLUS  (Czech translation of L'Héritage de Glace)
2017 L'encre et la chair, Paris, Les Cent Chemins  (Follow-up to L'Héritage de Glace)

Essays:
2012 De Gaulle campagne algérienne, Éditions Elytel, Paris, co-authored with Pierre Jaylet 
2014 Oradour-sur-Glane : autopsie d’un massacre, Éditions Elytel, Paris

Notes 
1.For instance, Andrew Byrd states in his review that "G[arnier] has done an admirably thorough job in his analysis of the Latin verbal system and has successfully convinced me that "(i)l y a en latin tout un vaste héritage fort archaïque que ne reflète pas du tout la doctrine reçue, telle qu'elle fut professée par les fondateurs de la discipline indo-européenne, et où l'on tient le latin pour une langue innovante" [… that Latin displays a vast amount of archaic inherited data, which is very different from what is usually said, following the teachings of the founders of Indo-European studies who viewed Latin as an innovative language]."

References

External links

Linguists from France
Place of birth missing (living people)
Academic staff of the University of Limoges
Living people
1976 births
Linguists of Indo-European languages
21st-century linguists
21st-century French novelists
21st-century French male writers
French male novelists